Marattia is a small genus of primitive, large, fleshy eusporangiate ferns.  It is the type genus of the family Marattiaceae, order Marattiales and class Marattiopsida. Formerly considered to be a much larger genus, genetic analysis has shown that Marattia in the broad sense was paraphyletic, and subsequently the genera Ptisana and Eupodium were split off. Except for one species in Hawaii, the genus is neotropical.

The plants are large and terrestrial, with more or less erect rhizomes and fronds being 2-5 times pinnate. Sporangia are fused into synangia, and spores are monolete.

Basal chromosome count is 2n=80. The type species is M. alata.

Species list
Marattia alata Sw. – Jamaica and Cuba
Marattia douglasii (C. Presl) Baker – pala, kapua ilio, or Hawaii potato fern; Hawaii
Marattia excavata Underw. – Mexico to Panama
Marattia interposita Christ – Guatemala to Panama
Marattia laxa Kunze – Mexico to Panama
Marattia weinmanniifolia Liebm. – southern Mexico to El Salvador

Phylogeny of Marattia

References

External links

Marattiidae
Ferns of the Americas
Fern genera
Taxa named by Olof Swartz